Tudor Rose (US title Nine Days a Queen) is a 1936 British film directed by Robert Stevenson and starring Cedric Hardwicke and Nova Pilbeam.

The film is a dramatization of Lady Jane Grey's brief reign as the Queen of England.  It opens with King Henry VIII on his deathbed stating the order of succession, and ends with Jane's beheading.  It took some liberties with the history of the period, including a fictional Earl of Warwick playing a similar role to John Dudley, 1st Duke of Northumberland in real life (Dudley having held the title Earl of Warwick earlier in his career).

The title refers to the Tudor rose. The story of Lady Jane Grey was also the basis for the film Lady Jane (1986).

Cast

Cedric Hardwicke as The Earl of Warwick
Nova Pilbeam as Lady Jane Grey
John Mills as Lord Guilford Dudley
Felix Aylmer as Edward Seymour, 1st Duke of Somerset
Leslie Perrins as Thomas Seymour
Frank Cellier as King Henry VIII
Desmond Tester as Edward VI
Gwen Ffrangcon-Davies as Mary Tudor
Martita Hunt as Lady Frances Brandon Grey, Lady Jane's mother
Miles Malleson as Henry Grey, 1st Duke of Suffolk, Lady Jane's father
Sybil Thorndike as Ellen
John Laurie as John Knox
Roy Emerton as Squire
John Turnbull as Arundell

Reception
Writing for The Spectator in 1936, Graham Greene gave the film a negative review, noting that he had "seldom listened to more inchoate rubbish than in Tudor Rose". Withholding harsh criticism of the direction which he described as "smooth, competent, if rather banal", Greene lambasted the historicity of the characterizations of the figures depicted, the dialogue/writing, and the scenes. According to Greene, "[t]here is not a character, not an incident in which history has not been altered for the cheapest of reasons", and he concluded that historical drama had reached "the Dark Age of scholarship and civilization".

The film was voted the second best British movie of 1936, after The Ghost Goes West, by readers of Film Weekly magazine. Nova Pilbeam won the magazine's Best Acting award, ahead of Robert Donat in the other film.

References

External links 
 

1936 films
British biographical films
British historical drama films
Films directed by Robert Stevenson
Films produced by Michael Balcon
British black-and-white films
1930s English-language films
1930s historical drama films
Films set in London
Films about Henry VIII
Cultural depictions of Lady Jane Grey
1936 drama films
1930s British films
Cultural depictions of Lord Guildford Dudley
Cultural depictions of Edward VI of England
Cultural depictions of Mary I of England